1989–90 Albanian Cup was the thirty-eighth season of Albania's annual cup competition. It began in August 1989 with the First Round and ended in May 1990 with the Final match. The winners of the competition qualified for the 1990-91 first round of the UEFA Cup. Dinamo Tirana were the defending champions, having won their eleventh Albanian Cup last season. The cup was won by Dinamo Tirana.

The first round was played in a single round-robin matches within 4 qualifying groups. The other rounds were played in a two-legged format similar to those of European competitions. If the aggregated score was tied after both games, the team with the higher number of away goals advanced. If the number of away goals was equal in both games, the match was decided by extra time and a penalty shootout, if necessary.

First round
Games were played on August & September 1989

Group A

Group B

Group C

Group D

Quarter-finals
In this round entered the 8 winners from the previous round.

|}

Semi-finals
In this round entered the four winners from the previous round.

|}

Final

References

 Calcio Mondiale Web

External links
 Official website 

Cup
1989–90 domestic association football cups
1989-90